Basil Robinson may refer to:

 Basil Robinson (RAF officer) (1912–1943), pilot with RAF Bomber Command during World War II
 Basil Robinson (cricketer) (1919–2012), Canadian cricketer
 Basil William Robinson, British art scholar and author